The Sun Times is a local newspaper which services the Bruce-Grey-Owen Sound area in the Canadian province of Ontario. Its headquarters are in Owen Sound.  The Times newspaper was founded in 1853 and The Sun newspaper was founded in 1893; they amalgamated in 1918. Daily editions of the amalgamated paper started in 1922.

The newspaper is owned and operated by Postmedia.

The current editor is Doug Edgar, a former reporter for the paper.

See also
List of newspapers in Canada

External links

Postmedia Network publications
Mass media in Owen Sound
Daily newspapers published in Ontario
Publications established in 1918
1918 establishments in Ontario